Daniel Allain is a Canadian politician from New Brunswick. He was elected to the Legislative Assembly of New Brunswick at the 2020 general election in the riding of Moncton East. He is currently Minister of Local Government and Local Governance Reform.

Political career 
In his early political career, Allain served as Premier Bernard Lord's constituency assistant in Moncton East from 2000 to 2003. Allain stood in the 2008 Canadian federal election in Moncton—Riverview—Dieppe. In 2013, during the mandate of Premier David Alward, he was appointed Deputy Minister of Management and Administration in the Office of the Premier of New Brunswick, and, in 2010, he was appointed President and Chief Executive Officer of NB Liquor.

From 2016 to 2020, Allain served as an at-large city councillor in Dieppe. As part of this municipal role, he also sat on the board of the Codiac Regional Policing Authority.

In the 2020 New Brunswick general election, Allain defeated Liberal MLA Monique LeBlanc and became the MLA for the Moncton East. As the only francophone in caucus and a former municipal councillor, Allain was made a member of the Executive Council of New Brunswick and given the position of Minister of Local Government and Local Governance Reform.

As Minister, Allain oversaw the implementation of significant reforms. Promoted as being the most substantial since Premier Robichaud's Equal Opportunity Program, the Higgs-Allain local governance reforms consolidated the province's many local governance entities from 340 to fewer than 100.

Electoral history

2020 New Brunswick general election

2008 Canadian federal election

References 

Living people
Members of the Executive Council of New Brunswick
People from Moncton
Progressive Conservative Party of New Brunswick MLAs
21st-century Canadian politicians
Year of birth missing (living people)